Viswanatha Nayakudu is a 1987 Telugu historical film directed by Dasari Narayana Rao. The film won four Nandi Awards.

Plot
The story is based on an Indian historical event during the 16th century. It narrates the victory of Viswanatha Nayak over his father to express his devotion towards Krishnadevaraya.

Viswanatha Nayak (Krishna) is the son of Nagama Nayak (Sivaji Ganesan), a successful general of Krishnadevaraya (Krishnam Raju) of the Vijayanagara Empire. King Veerasekhara Chola invades the Madurai Kingdom and deposes King Chandrasekhara Pandyan, who was under the protection of Krishnadevaraya. Due to this, an enraged Krishnadevaraya sends Nagama Nayak to aid Chandrasekhara Pandyan. Nagama Nayak suppresses Veerasekhara Chola and takes Madurai, but then suddenly throws off his allegiance and declines to help Chandrasekhara Pandyan, usurped the throne.

Viswanatha Nayak volunteers to face his father on the battle ground. Nagama Nayak is defeated and the loyalty of Viswanatha Nayak is proved. The chivalry of both father and son is admired by Krishnadevaraya, who makes Viswanatha Nayak the governor of Madurai and other regions.

Cast
 Krishna as Viswanatha Nayak
 Krishnam Raju as Krishnadevaraya
 Sivaji Ganesan as Nagama Nayak, Viswanatha Nayak's father
 Kanta Rao
 M. Prabhakar Reddy as Timmarusu, Krishnadevaraya's minister
 Mohan Babu
 K. R. Vijaya as Viswanatha Nayak's mother
 Jaya Prada as Kalavati, court dancer
 Ramakrishna as Natyacharya
 Nirmalamma as Kalavati's mother
 Dhulipala
 B. Padmanabham
 Prabha
 Rajasulochana
 Ranganath as Rajaraja Chola
 Sarath Babu
 J. V. Somayajulu
 Sumalata

Soundtrack

Awards
Nandi Awards

|-
| 1987
| P. Susheela(for "Kavi Jana Samaaja Bhoja")
| Nandi Award for Best Female Playback Singer
| 
|-
| 1987
| V. S. R. Swamy
| Nandi Award for Best Cinematographer
| 
|-
| 1987
| Bhaskar Raju
| Nandi Award for Best Art Director
| 
|-
| 1987
| P. Venkata Rao
| Nandi Award for Best Costume Designer
| 
|}

References

External links
 

1987 films
1980s Telugu-language films
Indian historical films
History of India on film
Films about royalty
Indian biographical films
1980s historical films
1980s biographical films
Biographical films about royalty
Films directed by Dasari Narayana Rao
Films scored by J. V. Raghavulu
Films set in the 16th century
Films set in ancient India
Films set in Karnataka
Films set in Tamil Nadu
Films set in the Vijayanagara Empire